Malte is a male given name that is mainly used in Denmark, Sweden and Germany, which is from Old Danish Malti. It originated from Helmhold / Helmwald ("helmet-govern") or from former Low German and Old Danish short form of Old German names beginning with Mahal- "assembly". It described the advisor of the Thing (assembly).

It may refer to: 

 Malte-Conrad Bruun (1755–1826), Danish-French geographer
 Malte Gallée (born 1993), German politician
 Malte Kaufmann (born 1976), German economist, entrepreneur and politician
 Malte Ludin (born 1942), German filmmaker
 Malte Persson (born 1976), Swedish author
 The Notebooks of Malte Laurids Brigge, novel by Rainer Maria Rilke

It is also the French name of Malta.

Surname 
 Ethelreda Malte, alleged illegitimate daughter of Henry VIII of England and the royal laundress.

References 

Scandinavian masculine given names
German masculine given names
Danish masculine given names
Swedish masculine given names